Gregory George Shambrook (born 3 January 1953) was a rugby union player who represented Australia.

Shambrook, a centre, was born in Bilinga, Queensland and claimed a total of 2 international rugby caps for Australia.

References

Australian rugby union players
Australia international rugby union players
1953 births
Living people
Rugby union players from Queensland
Rugby union centres